The Merry Men and Other Tales and Fables (1887) is a collection of short stories by Robert Louis Stevenson. The title derives from the local name given to a group of waves in the title short story, not from the Merry Men of Robin Hood tales.

Contents
 The Merry Men
 Will o' the Mill
 Markheim
 Thrawn Janet
 Olalla
 The Treasure of Franchard

External links

1887 short story collections
Short story collections by Robert Louis Stevenson
Chatto & Windus books
Horror short story collections